United States foreign policy in the Middle East has its roots in the 19th-century Barbary Wars that occurred shortly after the 1776 establishment of the United States as an independent sovereign state, but became much more expansive in the aftermath of World War II. With the goal of preventing the Soviet Union from gaining influence in the region during the Cold War, American foreign policy saw the deliverance of extensive support in various forms to anti-communist and anti-Soviet regimes; among the top priorities for the U.S. with regards to this goal was its support for the State of Israel against its Soviet-backed neighbouring Arab countries during the peak of the Arab–Israeli conflict. The U.S. also came to replace the United Kingdom as the main security patron for Saudi Arabia as well as the other Arab states of the Persian Gulf in the 1960s and 1970s in order to ensure, among other goals, a stable flow of oil from the Persian Gulf. , the U.S. has diplomatic relations with every country in the Middle East except for Iran, with whom relations were severed after the 1979 Islamic Revolution, and Syria, with whom relations were suspended in 2012 following the outbreak of the Syrian Civil War.

American influence in the Middle East has reduced in recent years, most significantly since the Arab Spring. Currently stated priorities of the U.S. government in the Middle East include resolving the Israeli–Palestinian conflict and limiting the spread of weapons of mass destruction among regional states, particularly Iran.

History

The United States' relationship with the Middle East prior to World War I was limited, although commercial ties existed even in the early 19th century. President Andrew Jackson established formal ties with the Sultan of Muscat and Oman in 1833. (The Sultan saw the U.S. as a potential balance to Britain's overwhelming regional influence.) Commercial relations opened between the U.S. and Persia in 1857, after Britain persuaded the Persian government not to ratify a similar agreement in 1851.

Britain and France took control of most of the former Ottoman Empire after defeating it in World War I. They held mandates from the League of Nations. The United States refused to take any mandates in the region and was "popular and respected throughout the Middle East". Indeed, "Americans were seen as good people, untainted by the selfishness and duplicity associated with the Europeans." American Christian missionaries brought modern medicine and set up educational institutions all over the Middle East as an adjunct to their religious proselytizing. Moreover, the United States had provided the Middle East with highly skilled petroleum engineers. Thus, there were some connections made between the United States and the Middle East before the Second World War. Other examples of cooperation between the U.S. and the Middle East are the Red Line Agreement signed in 1928 and the Anglo-American Petroleum Agreement signed in 1944. Both of these agreements were legally binding and reflected an American interest in control of Middle Eastern energy resources, mainly oil, and moreover reflected an American "security imperative to prevent the (re)emergence of a powerful regional rival". The Red Line Agreement had been "part of a network of agreements made in the 1920s to restrict supply of petroleum and ensure that the major [mostly American] companies ... could control oil prices on world markets". The Red Line agreement governed the development of Middle East oil for the next two decades. The Anglo-American Petroleum Agreement of 1944 was based on negotiations between the United States and Britain over the control of Middle Eastern oil. Below is shown what the American President Franklin D. Roosevelt had in mind for to a British Ambassador in 1944:

Persian oil ... is yours. We share the oil of Iraq and Kuwait. As for Saudi Arabian oil, it's ours.

On August 8, 1944, the Anglo-American Petroleum Agreement was signed, dividing Middle Eastern oil between the United States and Britain. Consequently, political scholar Fred H. Lawson remarks, that by the mid-1944, U.S. officials had buttressed their country's position on the peninsula by concluding an Anglo-American Petroleum Agreement that protected "all valid concession contracts and lawfully acquired rights" belonging to the signatories and established a principle of "equal opportunity" in those areas where no concession had yet been assigned. Furthermore, political scholar Irvine Anderson summarizes American interests in the Middle East in the late 19th century and the early 20th century noting that, "the most significant event of the period was the transition of the United States from the position of net exporter to one of net importer of petroleum."

By the end of the Second World War, Washington had come to consider the Middle East region as "the most strategically important area of the world." and "one of the greatest material prizes in world history," argues Noam Chomsky. For that reason, it was not until around the period of World War II that America became directly involved in the Middle East region. At this time the region was going through great social, economic, and political changes and as a result, internally the Middle East was in turmoil. Politically, the Middle East was experiencing an upsurge in the popularity of nationalistic politics and an increase in the number of nationalistic political groups across the region, which was causing great trouble for the English and French colonial powers.

Historian Jack Watson explains that "Europeans could not hold these lands indefinitely in the face of Arab nationalism". Watson then continues, stating that "by the end of 1946 Palestine was the last remaining mandate, but it posed a major problem". In truth, this nationalistic political trend clashed with American interests in the Middle East, which were, as Middle East scholar Louise Fawcett argues, "about the Soviet Union, access to oil and the project for a Jewish state in Palestine". Hence, Arabist Ambassador Raymond Hare described the Second World War, as "the great divide" in United States' relationship with the Middle East, because these three interests would later serve as a backdrop and reasoning for a great deal of American interventions in the Middle East and thus also come to be the cause of several future conflicts between the United States & the Middle East.

Formation of Israel

In 1947, the U.S. and the Truman administration, under domestic political pressure, pushed for a solution and resolution on the Arab–Israeli conflict, and in May 1948 the new state of Israel came into existence. This process was not without its fights and loss of lives. Nevertheless, "the first state to extend diplomatic recognition to Israel was the United States; the Soviet Union and several Western nations quickly followed suit. No Arab state, however, recognized Israel."

Syria: 1949

Syria became an independent republic in 1946, but the March 1949 Syrian coup d'état, led by Army Chief of Staff Husni al-Za'im, ended the initial period of civilian rule. Za'im met at least six times with CIA operatives in the months prior to the coup to discuss his plan to seize power. Za'im requested American funding or personnel, but it is not known whether this assistance was provided. Once in power, Za'im made several key decisions that benefitted the United States. He approved the Trans-Arabian Pipeline (TAPLINE), an American project designed to transport Saudi Arabian oil to Mediterranean ports. Construction of TAPLINE had been delayed due to Syrian intransigence. Za'im also improved relations with two American allies in the region: Israel and Turkey. He signed an armistice with Israel, formally ending the 1948 Arab–Israeli War and he renounced Syrian claims to Hatay Province, a major source of dispute between Syria and Turkey. Za'im also cracked down on local communists. However, Za'im's regime was short-lived. He was overthrown in August, just four and a half months after seizing power.

Mosaddeq and the Shah

Opposed to foreign intervention in Iran and a keen nationalist, Mohammed Mosaddeq became the prime minister of Iran in 1951. Thus, when Mosaddeq was elected he chose to nationalize the Iranian oil industry, where previously British holdings had generated great profits for Britain through the Anglo-Iranian Oil Company. Furthermore, prior to the nationalization of Iranian oil, Mosaddeq had also cut all diplomatic ties with Britain. The Shah of Iran, Mohammad Reza Pahlavi was opposed to the nationalization of Iranian oil as he feared this would result in an oil embargo, which would destroy Iran's economy and thus, the Shah was very concerned with the effect of Mosaddeq's policies on Iran. Equally worried were workers in the Iranian oil industry, when they experienced the economic effect of the sanctions on Iranian oil exports which Mosaddeq's policies had resulted in, and riots were happening across Iran.

Thus, Mohammad Reza Pahlavi asked Mosaddeq to resign, as was the Shah's constitutional right, but Mosaddeq refused, which resulted in national uprisings. The Shah, fearing for his personal security, fled the country but nominated General Fazlollah Zahedi as the new Prime Minister. Although General Fazlollah Zahedi was a nationalist, he did not agree with the Mosaddeq's lenient attitude towards the communist Tudeh party, which the United States had also become increasingly concerned with, fearing Soviet influence spreading in the Middle East. Therefore, in late 1952, the British government asked the U.S. administration for help with the removal of Mohammed Mosaddeq. President Harry S. Truman thought Mossadeq was a valuable bulwark against Soviet influence. However, Truman left office in January 1953, and the new administration of Dwight Eisenhower shared British concern over Mossadeq. Allen Dulles, the director of the CIA, approved one million dollars on April 4, 1953, to be used "in any way that would bring about the fall of Mossadegh" Consequently, after a failed attempt on August 15, "on August 19, 1953, General Fazlollah Zahedi succeeded [with the help of the United States and Britain] and Mossadegh was overthrown. The CIA covertly funneled five million dollars to General Zahedi's regime on August 21, 1953."

This CIA operation, often referred to as Operation Ajax and led by CIA officer Kermit Roosevelt Jr., ensured the return of the Shah on August 22, 1953.

The Suez Crisis

Although accepting large sums of military aid from the United States in 1954, by 1956 Egyptian leader Nasser had grown tired of the American influence in the country. The involvement that the U.S. would take in Egyptian business and politics in return for aid, Nasser thought "smacked of colonialism." Indeed, as political scholar B.M. Bleckman argued in 1978, "Nasser had ambivalent feelings toward the United States. From 1952 to 1954 he was on close terms with U.S. officials and was viewed in Washington as a promising moderate Arab leader. The conclusion of an arms deal with the USSR in 1955, however, had cooled the relationship between Cairo and Washington considerably, and the Dulles-Eisenhower decision to withdraw the offer to finance the Aswan High Dam in mid-1956 was a further blow to the chances of maintaining friendly ties. Eisenhower's stand against the British, French and Israeli attack on Egypt in October 1956 created a momentary sense of gratitude on the part of Nasser, but the subsequent development of the Eisenhower Doctrine, so clearly aimed at 'containing' Nasserism, undermined what little goodwill existed toward the United States in Cairo." "The Suez Crisis of 1956 marked the demise of British power and its gradual replacement by USA as the dominant power in the Middle East." The Eisenhower Doctrine became a manifestation of this process. "The general objective of the Eisenhower Doctrine, like that of the Truman Doctrine formulated ten years earlier, was the containment of Soviet expansion." Furthermore, when the Doctrine was finalized on March 9, 1957, it "essentially gave the president the latitude to intervene militarily in the Middle East ... without having to resort to Congress." indeed as, Middle East scholar Irene L. Gerdzier explains "that with the Eisenhower Doctrine the United States emerged "as the uncontested Western power ... in the Middle East."

Eisenhower Doctrine

In response to the power vacuum in the Middle East following the Suez Crisis, the Eisenhower administration developed a new policy designed to stabilize the region against Soviet threats or internal turmoil. Given the collapse of British prestige and the rise of Soviet interest in the region, the president informed Congress on January 5, 1957, that it was essential for the U.S. to accept new responsibilities for the security of the Middle East. Under the policy, known as the Eisenhower Doctrine, any Middle Eastern country could request American economic assistance or aid from U.S. military forces if it was being threatened by armed aggression. Though Eisenhower found it difficult to convince leading Arab states or Israel to endorse the doctrine, but he applied the new doctrine by dispensing economic aid to shore up the Kingdom of Jordan, encouraging Syria's neighbors to consider military operations against it, and sending U.S. troops into Lebanon to prevent a radical revolution from sweeping over that country. The troops sent to Lebanon never saw any fighting, but the deployment marked the only time during Eisenhower's presidency when U.S. troops were sent abroad into a potential combat situation.

Though U.S. aid helped Lebanon and Jordan avoid revolution, the Eisenhower doctrine enhanced Nasser's prestige as the preeminent Arab nationalist. Partly as a result of the bungled U.S. intervention in Syria, Nasser established the short-lived United Arab Republic, a political union between Egypt and Syria. The U.S. also lost a sympathetic Middle Eastern government due to the 1958 Iraqi coup d'état, which saw King Faisal I replaced by General Abd al-Karim Qasim as the leader of Iraq.

Jordan

Meanwhile, in Jordan nationalistic anti-government rioting broke out and the United States decided to send a battalion of marines to nearby Lebanon prepared to intervene in Jordan later that year. Douglas Little argues that Washington's decision to use the military resulted from a determination to support a beleaguered, conservative pro-Western regime in Lebanon, repel Nasser's pan-Arabism, and limit Soviet influence in the oil-rich region. However Little concludes that the unnecessary American action brought negative long-term consequences, notably the undermining of Lebanon's fragile, multi-ethnic political coalition and the alienation of  Arab nationalism throughout the region.  To keep the pro-American King Hussein of Jordan in power, the CIA sent millions of dollars a year of subsidies. In the mid-1950s the U.S. supported allies in Lebanon, Iraq, Turkey, and Saudi Arabia and sent fleets to be near Syria. However, 1958 was to become a difficult year in U.S. foreign policy; in 1958 Syria and Egypt were merged into the "United Arab Republic", anti-American and anti-government revolts started occurring in Lebanon, causing the Lebanese president Chamoun to ask America for help, and the very pro-American King Feisal the 2nd of Iraq was overthrown by a group of nationalistic military officers. It was quite "commonly believed that [Nasser] ... stirred up the unrest in Lebanon and, perhaps, had helped to plan the Iraqi revolution."

The Six-Day War and Black September

In June 1967 Israel fought with Egypt, Jordan, and Syria in the Six-Day War. As a result of the war, Israel captured the West Bank, Golan Heights, and the Sinai Peninsula. The U.S. supported Israel with weapons and continued to support Israel financially throughout the 1970s. On September 17, 1970, with U.S. and Israeli help, Jordanian troops attacked PLO guerrilla camps, while Jordan's U.S.-supplied air force dropped napalm from above. The U.S. deployed the aircraft carrier Independence and six destroyers off the coast of Lebanon and readied troops in Turkey to support the assault.

The American interventions in the years before the Iranian revolution have all proven to be based in part on economic considerations, but more so have been influenced and led by the international Cold War context.

Kuwait and the Gulf War

The Gulf War in 1991 opposes a coalition of 35 countries led by the United States against Iraq after it invades Kuwait. Iraq had been an ally of the Soviet Union during the Cold war, resulting in little relation with the US. After Iraq threatened to invade Kuwait, the US said they would also protect their allies in the region against Iraq's invasion. After the invasion in 1990, economic sanctions are implemented when the US request a meeting of the United Nations Security Council and adopt Resolution 660. The US rejected the proposal of the Iraqi army to leave Kuwait if a solution for Palestine is found. Military means are employed by the US in 1991, as Resolution 678 allows. Also, the coalition is created, with 73% of the armed force being American. The United States armed forces lead many attacks on the Iraqi army in several battles, through air strikes and land battles.

Iran–Iraq War
On 22 September 1980, Saddam Hussein's Iraq attacked Ayatollah Khomeini ruled Iran, starting bombing 10 military airfields.

Support for Iraq
Ted Koppel's ABC News broadcast of July 1992 points out the US cooperation with Iraq, by sending money, armaments, dual-use technology and if necessary, the provision of emergency action plans against Iran. According to revealed CIA files, the United States supported Hussein's Iraq even to the point of a US awareness of Iraqi use of chemical armaments. This violated the 1925 Geneva Protocol, which Iraq did not approve. Moreover, the US Defense Intelligence Agency provided Iraq with satellite positions of Iranian troops to help keep track of the enemies. American position in the war played "a secretly but unambiguously" pro-Iraq support. Several scholars have argued the US gave a "green light" to Hussein's attack on Iran. Yet, considering now available US and Iraqi papers, the "green light" hypothesis is "more a myth than reality". US did not provide an initial encouragement to let the war begin as well as Hussein's attack was independent of the US.

Support for Iran
US-Iran relations drastically changed since the Iranian 1979 revolution. It marked the fall of the Shah and its closeness with the Western world and the takeover of Khomeini with a return to Islamic law. In 1979 the US Embassy in Teheran was caught by protesters, and American civilians were taken hostages. In 1980, the US changed policy to allow Israel to sell American armament to Iran during the war. The deal between US and Israel was coordinated by the State Department Counselor, McFarlane, with US Secretary of State Alexander Haig Jr. and Israeli Prime Minister Menachem Begin agreeing to a 6 to 18 months period weapons' provision. This support to Iran was first explained as a way to have back the American hostages. Yet, the hostages were delivered before the US supply of weapons to Iran. In addition, this armament provision lasts for more than the established period. Indeed, this was later known as the Iran-Contra Affair publicly divulgated in November 1985. US supplied weapons to Iran through Israel, and the profit gained went to finance the Contra rebels, opponents to the Nicaragua Sandinista Front.

Saudi Arabia

Saudi Arabia and the United States are strategic allies, but relations with the U.S. became strained following September 11 attacks.*

Foreign policies of the US in Saudi Arabia started with the Pact of Quincyin 1945, which engages the US in protecting the Saud family in exchange for providing oil to the US. Also, military aid was provided to Saudi Arabia during the Gulf War with almost 500 000 soldiers sent to Saudi Arabia to protect from Iraq. These events contributed to making the Saud Family dependent on US protection

In March 2015, President Barack Obama declared that he had authorized U.S. forces to provide logistical and intelligence support to the Saudis in their military intervention in Yemen, establishing a "Joint Planning Cell" with Saudi Arabia. The report by Human Rights Watch stated that US-made bombs were being used in attacks indiscriminately targeting civilians and violating the laws of war.

US- Saudi Arabia Arm deal 

Both countries have an interest in fighting terrorism and are allies. In 2017, an agreement aiming to provide Saudi Arabia with $115 billion of weapons containing tanks, combat ships and missile defence systems is announced by President Donald Trump. In 2018, the Saudi Government had purchased over $14.5 billion of weapons to the US. Also in 2018, the Saudi-led coalition fighting terrorism in Yemen bombed a school bus killing 40 children, with a bomb provided by the United States. Many criticized the United States' support for Saudi intervention in Yemen which contributed to the killing of 10 000 children. In december 2018, the end of American assistance to Saudi Arabia's war in Yemen in voted by senators.

The lack of support from the US for the Saudi-led coalition interventions in Yemen stained the relationship of the two countries, causing Saudi Arabia to refuse the US's request of increasing oil production.

Iraq (2003–present)

Libya (2011–present)

Yemen

20th century 
The US established diplomatic relations with Yemen in 1947 when it becomes a member of the United Nations. The Yemen Arab Republic is created in 1962 and recognized by the US the same year. In 1967, the US recognize the People's Democratic Republic of Yemen. The 20th century's Us policies in Yemen support the unification and are largely concentrated on humanitarian aid and some military operations. In the 1990s, the US develop a $42 million program in Yemen subsidizing agriculture, education and health. In return, the Yemeni government cooperates with US oil companies. US-Yemen relationship deteriorates when both take different sides during the Kuwait crisis

21st century 
Al-Qaeda's terrorist attacks in the United States have transformed US's policies in Yemen. The US has engaged in many military actions against the terrorist group but also humanitarian help and cooperation with other actors. Also, the Yemeni government improved its cooperation in dismantling the terrorist group with the US government after this event.

 Humanitarian aid

Over the last decades, the US has responded to Yemen's humanitarian crisis caused by the war. The reported funding in the country from the US has increased this past decade from $115m in 2012 to almost a billion in 2019. It funds sectors like the supply of food security, health, education and protection. But the blockade of access to the country by the Saudi-led coalition, which has received support from the United States, prevents humanitarian aid to be fully applied.

 Military interventions

Military policies in Yemen have increased since the replacement of the previous president Ali Abdullah Saleh by Abdrabbuh Mansur Hadi, far more cooperative in fighting terrorism in Yemen. Military policies are characterized by the training of the military by the US forces, the supply of weapons but also air strikes. The US also concluded an agreement with Saudi Arabia in 2015 which engages the US in supplying weapons to Saudi Arabia for counterterrorist actions in Yemen.

Syria (2011–present)
2011 saw several anti-governmental protests arising in many Arab countries, known as the Arab Spring. Syria opposed the Assad government through demonstrations which were put down fomenting a civil war.

US involvement in the Syrian civil war started under the Obama presidency, with the involvement of US troops in 2015.  US troops' involvement continued under the Trump presidency, although Trump stated on several occasions that he did not want "boots on the ground" in Syria for much longer, asking the army to retire altogether, which never happened. US continued to lead an alliance of up to 74 countries to fight against ISIS terrorist organization, but also with peacekeeping and patrolling of oilfields missions. The situation became more complicated in 2019, after Turkey struck an agreement with Russia, whose army also got directly involved. The US and the Western coalition got involved in multiple fights, mostly on the side of the Kurdish led YPG and SDF liberation army, causing therefore tensions with Turkey, which fundamentally never stopped fighting Kurds in Syria. Trump's presidency has not made things any easier for US troops deployed in Syria, moving from showing little interest to showing interest in the oilfields located in the North-Eastern province of Syria, to finally showing signs of appropriating a victory that did not really happen. But the situation remains far from clear for the US army in Syria with its presence continuing under the Biden presidency, with focus on military operations and airstrikes shifting towards the East, to better fight Iran supported militias.

Turkey

Coup attempt (2016)
On 15 July 2016, a coup d'état was attempted in Turkey by a faction within the Turkish Armed Forces against state institutions, including, but not limited to the government and President Recep Tayyip Erdoğan.

The Turkish government accused the coup leaders of being linked to the Gülen movement, which is designated as a terrorist organization by the Republic of Turkey and led by Fethullah Gülen, a Turkish businessman and cleric who lives in Pennsylvania, United States. Erdoğan accuses Gülen of being behind the coup—a claim that Gülen denies—and accused the United States of harboring him. President Recep Tayyip Erdoğan accused the head of United States Central Command, chief General Joseph Votel of "siding with coup plotters," (after Votel accused the Turkish government of arresting the Pentagon's contacts in Turkey).

American allies
States
 (see Israel–United States relations) (Major non-NATO ally)
 (see Saudi Arabia–United States relations)
 Imperial State of Iran (see Iran–United States relations, 1953 Iranian coup d'état)
 (see Turkey–United States relations)
 (see Qatar–United States relations) (Major non-NATO ally)
 (see Bahrain–United States relations) (Major non-NATO ally)
 (see Kuwait–United States relations) (Major non-NATO ally)
 (see United Arab Emirates–United States relations)
 (see Jordan–United States relations) (Major non-NATO ally)
 (see Egypt–United States relations) (Major non-NATO ally)
 (see Cyprus–United States relations)

Autonomous provinces
 Iraqi Kurdistan (see Iraqi Kurdistan–United States relations)

Factions and Organizations
 People's Mujahedin of Iran
 National Council of Resistance of Iran
 Pahlavi Royal Family (led by Reza Pahlavi)
Syrian Democratic Forces
 Free Syrian Army

Hostile/sore relations
States
 (see Iran–United States relations, United States sanctions against Iran)
 (see Syria–United States relations)
 (see Turkey–United States relations) (Although a NATO member, the relations between the two have significantly deteriorated.)

Organizations
 Islamic Revolutionary Guard Corps

 Popular Mobilization Forces

Criticism

See also
 Middle Eastern foreign policy of the Barack Obama administration
 Foreign relations of the Arab League
 Arab lobby in the United States
 United States–Middle East economic relations
 Dual containment
 Gulf War
 Mission Accomplished
 British foreign policy in the Middle East

References

Further reading
 Baxter, Kylie, and Shahram Akbarzadeh. US foreign policy in the Middle East: The roots of anti-Americanism (Routledge, 2012)
 Bunch, Clea. "Reagan and the Middle East." in  Andrew L. Johns, ed., A Companion to Ronald Reagan (2015) pp: 453–468. online
 Cramer, Jane K., and A. Trevor Thrall, eds. Why Did the United States Invade Iraq? (Routledge, 2013)
  Fawcett, Louise, ed. International relations of the Middle East (3rd ed. Oxford UP, 2016) full text online
 Freedman, Lawrence. A Choice of Enemies: America Confronts the Middle East (Public Affairs, 2009)  excerpt
 Gause III, F. Gregory. "“Hegemony” Compared: Great Britain and the United States in the Middle East." Security Studies 28.3 (2019): 565-587. “Hegemony” Compared: Great Britain and the United States in the Middle East
 Hemmer, Christopher. Which lessons matter?: American foreign policy decision making in the Middle East, 1979-1987 (SUNY Press, 2012)
 Jacobs, Matthew F. Imagining the Middle East: The Building of an American Foreign Policy, 1918-1967 (2011)
 Kelley, Stephen A. "Getting to War: American Security Policy in the Persian Gulf, 1969-1991." (Naval Postgraduate School Monterey United States, 2020) online.
 Laqueur, Walter. The Struggle for the Middle East: The Soviet Union and the Middle East 1958-70 (1972) online
 Lesch, David W. and Mark L. Haas, eds. The Middle East and the United States: History, Politics, and Ideologies (6th ed, 2018) excerpt
 Little, Douglas.  "His finest hour? Eisenhower, Lebanon, and the 1958 Middle East crisis." Diplomatic History 20.1 (1996): 27–54. online
 O'Sullivan, Christopher D. FDR and the End of Empire: The Origins of American Power in the Middle East (2012)
 Petersen, Tore. Anglo-American Policy toward the Persian Gulf, 1978–1985: Power, Influence and Restraint (Sussex Academic Press, 2015)
 Pillar, Paul R. Intelligence and US Foreign Policy: Iraq, 9/11, and Misguided Reform (Columbia UP, 2014) 432p
 Pollack, Kenneth.  Unthinkable: Iran, the bomb, and American strategy (2014)
 Wahlrab, Amentahru, and Michael J. McNeal, eds. US approaches to the Arab uprisings: International relations and democracy promotion (Bloomsbury, 2017).

External links
 US State Department Bureau of Near Eastern Affairs
 Middle East – U.S. Relations from the Dean Peter Krogh Foreign Affairs Digital Archives
 Establishment of U.S. Consuls and Colonies in the Levant  – Shapell Manuscript Foundation

Foreign relations of the United States
History of the foreign relations of the United States
History of the Middle East
20th-century military history of the United States
United States foreign policy
United States–Middle Eastern relations
Petroleum politics